Gaston III may refer to:

 Gaston III, Viscount of Béarn  (died on or before 1045)
 Gaston III, Count of Foix (1331–1391)